Idea is the fifth album by the Bee Gees. Released in September 1968, the album sold over a million copies worldwide. The album was issued in both mono and stereo pressings in the UK. The artwork on the Polydor release designed by Wolfgang Heilemann featured a "beehive" neon lightbulb with a group photo in its base, while the North American ATCO release designed by Klaus Voormann featured a composite head made from each band member. It was their third internationally released album – the first two albums being released only in the Australian market.

"I've Gotta Get a Message to You" and "I Started a Joke" were both released as singles in North America. In the UK, "Message" was released only as a single and "I Started a Joke" was only an album track, though another album track, "Kitty Can", was featured on the B-side of "I've Gotta Get a Message to You."

The North American ATCO LP and the South African Polydor LP replaced "Such a Shame" with "I've Gotta Get a Message to You". Both songs were included when the album was released on CD in 1989.

Background
Idea, released in September 1968, was the Bee Gees' third international album. "We were in friction at that point," says Barry. "We weren't getting on, and that was it. I think it was a mixture of the group not getting along very well and egos. Ego, I think, is the key word for this group. It's not unlike any other group in that everybody wants to be the one that gets the attention. Unfortunately, I think that happens a lot. Certainly it happened to us."

Many of the songs on the album's second side reflect a yearning for escape ("When the Swallows Fly," "I've Decided to Join the Air Force," "Swan Song") while Vince Melouney's "Such a Shame" was, by his own admission, about how it was a shame that the group was disintegrating.

"In the Summer of His Years" was Robin's requiem for the Beatles' manager Brian Epstein who had died in August 1967. "I've Decided to Join the Air Force" was written specially for the occasion when the Bee Gees played at the Royal Albert Hall earlier in 1968 with the musicians of the Royal Air Force backing them.

Barry Gibb performed "Kilburn Towers" on his Mythology tour of 2013-14 while "Swan Song" made a surprise appearance on the first disc of the 2010 Mythology compilation.

Recording
The band recorded its previous album Horizontal between July and December 1967. The last song recorded was "Swan Song," but this was not released until 1968 on Idea. "Words" was released as a single in place of "Swan Song."

The band started recording Idea in January 1968 after a Christmas holiday in Australia, and few weeks after the Horizontal sessions. The songs recorded were "Chocolate Symphony", "The Singer Sang His Song", "Down to Earth", "I Can Lift a Mountain", ("Gena's Theme" was finished in June,) "Jumbo" was released as a non-album single, "Bridges Crossing Rivers", and "She Is Russia". The February songs are "In the Summer of His Years" and "I've Decided to Join the Air Force". By March, Barry, Maurice, and Colin participated on the track "By the Light of the Burning Candle" by The Marbles, a newly formed band at that time made up of members Graham Bonnet and Trevor Gordon. Between June and July in 1968, they recorded "Kitty Can", "I.O.I.O.", "Let There Be Love", "Stepping Out", and "No Name". In June, Robin recorded "The Band Will Meet Mr. Justice", "The People's Public Joke", "Indian Gin and Whisky Dry", "The Girl to Share Each Day", "Come Some Halloween or Christmas Day", "My Love Life Expired", and "Heaven in My Hand", a mono tape of seven songs which was credited only to him. In the same month, they recorded "Completely Unoriginal", "Kilburn Towers", the Vince Melouney composition "Such a Shame", "Indian Gin and Whisky Dry", "When the Swallows Fly", "Idea", "Come Some Christmas Eve or Halloween", "Maypole News", "Men of Men", and "I Started a Joke".

The other songs recorded around 1968 included "Sitting in the Meadow" and "Another Cold and Windy Day," both recorded for Coca-Cola, "In the Middle of Grass," "Let Your Heart Out," and "The Square Cup". "Everything That Came From Mother Goose" was written by Colin Petersen and Maurice Gibb, and Petersen mentioned this song in an interview in September 1968. In July, "I've Gotta Get a Message to You" was recorded in the same session as "I Laugh in Your Face" (released on Odessa, 1969) following the completion of the album, but was only included on the US version.

Release and reception

This album features "Such a Shame", the only non-Gibb Bee Gees song included on any of their studio albums, written and co-sung by lead guitarist Vince Melouney. The song was included on the British version of the album but deleted from the American issue, which instead included their recent hit "I've Gotta Get a Message to You", not on the UK LP. When the album was issued on CD in the 1980s, both tracks were included. "I Started a Joke" was not issued as a single in the UK, but it reached No. 6 in America. The UK sleeve had a lightbulb on a dark blue ground. In 2006, Reprise Records reissued Idea (using the European cover) with both stereo and mono mixes on one disc and a bonus disc of unreleased songs, non-album tracks, and alternate mixes. After the release of Idea, the band went to Brussels for the TV special Idea in September, and European tour in October and November. After that, Vince left the band saying, "I was just too young, too naive." His final album with the band was Odessa, which was recorded in August that year.

Allmusic's Bruce Eder described "I Started a Joke" as very much of piece with their early work. Eder said that "Kitty Can", "Indian Gin and Whisky Dry" and "Such a Shame" sounded like the output of a working band with a cohesive group sound, rather than a harmony vocal group with accompaniment.

Track listing (UK)
All songs written by Barry, Robin and Maurice Gibb, except "Such a Shame", written and composed by Vince Melouney.

American release

It was released also in September on the Atco label, and was released in stereo. "I've Gotta Get a Message to You" was included on this version instead of "Such a Shame". Its cover was a composite head by Klaus Voormann, the artist who also did the Bee Gees' 1st art.

Personnel
Bee Gees
Barry Gibb – lead, harmony and backing vocals, rhythm guitar
Robin Gibb – lead, harmony and backing vocals, Hammond organ
Maurice Gibb – harmony and backing vocals, bass guitar, piano, Hammond organ, Mellotron
Vince Melouney – lead guitar, harmonica, lead vocals on "Such a Shame"
Colin Petersen – drums

Additional musician and production
Bill Shepherd – orchestral arrangement
Bee Gees – producer
Robert Stigwood – producer
John Pantry, Damon Lyon Shaw – engineer
Klaus Voormann – art cover (US version)

Charts

Weekly charts

References

Bee Gees albums
1968 albums
Polydor Records albums
Atco Records albums
Reprise Records albums
Albums produced by Robert Stigwood
Albums produced by Maurice Gibb
Albums produced by Barry Gibb
Albums produced by Robin Gibb
Albums with cover art by Klaus Voormann
Albums recorded at IBC Studios
Psychedelic rock albums by English artists
Soft rock albums by English artists